Minyar is a town in Ashinsky District of Chelyabinsk Oblast, Russia, located in the valley of the Sim River at its confluence with the Minyar River,  west of Chelyabinsk, the administrative center of the oblast. Population:

History
It was founded in 1771. Town status was granted to it on May 14, 1943.

Administrative and municipal status
Within the framework of administrative divisions, it is, together with one rural locality (the settlement of Volkovo), incorporated within Ashinsky District as the Town of Minyar. As a municipal division, the Town of Minyar is incorporated within Ashinsky Municipal District as Minyarskoye Urban Settlement.

References

Notes

Sources

Cities and towns in Chelyabinsk Oblast
Ufa Governorate
Populated places established in 1771